General elections are scheduled to held in Palau on 12 November 2024 to elect a President and the National Congress.

Electoral system
The President of Palau is elected using the two-round system.

The 13 members of the Senate are elected from a single nationwide constituency by block voting, with each voter having 13 votes to cast. The 16 members of the House of Delegates are elected in single-member constituencies based on the states using first-past-the-post voting.

References

Presidential elections in Palau
Elections in Palau
Palau